Mamacita ("mommy" in Spanish) may refer to: a pretty lady

People
Chyna (1969–2016), WWE wrestler also known as Mamacita

Art, entertainment, and media
Mamacita, a contestant on Real Chance of Love

Albums
Mamacita (Super Junior album), 2014
Mamacita, compilation album by Riddim Driven

Songs
"Mamacita" (Black Eyed Peas, Ozuna and J. Rey Soul song), 2020
"Mamacita" (Mark Medlock song), 2009
"Mamacita" (Public Announcement song), 2000
"Mamacita" (Super Junior song), or "Mamacita (Ayaya)", 2014
"Mamacita" (The Grass Roots song), 1975
"Mamacita" (Tinie Tempah song), 2016
"Mamacita", song by Baby Bash feat. Marcos Hernandez
"Mamacita", song by Banaroo from the 2006 album Amazing
"Mamacita", song by Bligg, 2014
"Mamacita", song by Cold War Kids from Chickens in Love
"Mamacita", song by Collie Budz from the 2007 album Collie Buddz
"Mamacita", song by Don Cisco from the 2000 album Oh Boy
"Mamacita", song by Enrique Iglesias from the 2002 album Quizás
"Mamacita", song by Fats Waller And His Rhythm, Waller, Anita Waller, 1954 covered by Joe Henderson, Jim Rotondi
"Mamacita", song by Fulano de Tal, 1997
"Mamacita", song by Heidi Brühl, Heidi Brühl, Danny Santos, 1982
"Mamacita", song by Jason Derulo featuring Farruko, 2019
"Mamacita", song by Jesse Jagz from the 2007 album Jagz Nation, Vol.1. Thy Nation Come
"Mamacita", song by Jonny Z
"Mamacita", instrumental by Kenny Dorham from Trompeta Toccata, 1964
"Mamacita", song by Nora Aunor from the 1970 album Christmas with Nora Aunor
"Mamacita", song by Outkast from Aquemini
"Mamacita", song by Pharrell Williams and Daddy Yankee from The Fast and the Furious: Tokyo Drift soundtrack
"Mamacita", song by Ray Slijngaard and Marvin D. as VIP Allstars, 1999
"Mamacita", song by Ritchie Adams, 1976
"Mamacita", song by The Electric Swing Circus from the 2017 album It Flew By
"Mamacita", song by Travis Scott from Days Before Rodeo
"Mamacita", song by Troop from the 1988 album Troop
"Mamacita", song by Vybz Kartel
"Mamacita (Paparico)", song by Julio Iglesias from the 2000 album Noche de Cuatro Lunas
"¿Mamacita, Dónde Está Santa Claus?" song by Augie Rios, 1959

Restaurants
Mamacita Bay Area Restaurant of Lawrence Vavra and Christie Clark
Mamacita's Mexican Food Restaurants (founded in 1985) Hossein "Hagi" Hagighola Kerrville, Texas